The 1960 Columbia Lions football team was an American football team that represented Columbia University during the 1960 NCAA University Division football season. Columbia finished fifth in the Ivy League. 

In their fourth season under head coach Aldo "Buff" Donelli, the Lions compiled a 3–6 record and were outscored 191 to 126. Robert McCool was the team captain.  

The Lions' 3–4 conference record placed fifth in the Ivy League. Columbia was outscored 121 to 118 by Ivy opponents. 

Columbia played its home games at Baker Field in Upper Manhattan, in New York City.

Schedule

References

Columbia
Columbia Lions football seasons
Columbia Lions football